Fragments of Freedom is the third album by the English electronic group Morcheeba, which was released in 2000. It was one of their most successful albums in terms of chart sales. Special versions of the CD contained a short CD-ROM video of the 'Making of Fragments of Freedom' and also music videos.

Reception

NME declared Fragments to be "an enduring monument to quiet goodness", while The A.V. Club considered it to have "fine and adventurous" songs that "are more than worthy of the band's legacy", but noted that the wide variety of styles between individual tracks means that it "never quite builds up artistic momentum."

Pitchfork, however, criticised the album's contents as "no less flat, smooth, or mass-produced than its jewel case", stating that there was "skill and craft" but no "personality or creativity", and that the backup singers make it more difficult to enjoy Skye Edwards' voice; similarly, Robert Christgau rated the album a "dud".

Track listing
All songs written by P.Godfrey, R.Godfrey, S. Edwards, except where noted.

Charts

Weekly charts

Year-end charts

Certifications and sales

References

2000 albums
Morcheeba albums
Sire Records albums